Barbarella was the designation of the first German hybrid rocket. It was developed under the management of R. Schmucker and W. Schauer at the beginning of the 1970s by students of the Munich technical university and launched on March 12, 1974 from the drilling platform "Barbara" in the Baltic Sea. The Barbarella had a thrust of 370 N and used as fuel a toluidine-aminophenol mixture and nitric acid. The Barbarella is today displayed in the Deutsches Museum in Munich.

The rocket was named "Barbarella" after the movie of the same name, Barbarella, to differentiate it from other more grandiosely named rockets. Its lettering was a pop art style, atypical from the more scientific lettering commonly used on rockets.

References

External links
 History of hybrid rockets
 Space Cover #336: Barbarella rocket launch

Rockets and missiles